The Flag of the Department of North Santander was adopted by means of the Ordinance Nº 08, on November 27, 1978, as the official Flag for the Department of Norte de Santander in Colombia.

Design and meaning

The flag has a defaced horizontal bicolor design. According to the Ordinance Nº 08, the flag would have the same proportions as the Flag of Colombia and would be composed of two horizontal stripes of equal length: the top one would be red and the bottom one, black, with four stars forming a rhombus, one in the interior of each stripe, and the other two on the dividing line of the colors.

 The Red symbolizes the heroism and blood of the patriots.
 The Black symbolizes oil which is drilled in the region.
 The four Stars represent the four provinces that formed the department when it was first formed, Cúcuta, Pamplona, Ocaña and Chinácota.

References
 http://www.nortedesantander.gov.co/

N
Norte de Santander Department
Flags introduced in 1978